The 2021 Sofia Open was a tennis tournament played on indoor hard courts. It was the 6th edition of the Sofia Open as part of the ATP World Tour 250 series of the 2021 ATP Tour. It was played at the Arena Armeec in Sofia, Bulgaria, from 27 September to 3 October 2021.

Champions

Singles 

  Jannik Sinner def.  Gaël Monfils 6–3, 6–4

Doubles 

  Jonny O'Mara /  Ken Skupski def.  Oliver Marach /  Philipp Oswald, 6–3, 6–4

Singles main-draw entrants

Seeds

1 Rankings are as of 20 September 2021.

Other entrants
The following players received wildcards into the main draw:
  Adrian Andreev 
  Dimitar Kuzmanov 
  Alexandar Lazarov

The following players received entry from the qualifying draw:
  Egor Gerasimov
  Illya Marchenko
  Pedro Martínez
  Andreas Seppi

The following player received entry as a lucky loser:
  Kamil Majchrzak

Withdrawals
Before the tournament
  Roberto Bautista Agut → replaced by  James Duckworth
  Alexander Bublik → replaced by  Kamil Majchrzak
  Marin Čilić → replaced by  Gianluca Mager
  Mackenzie McDonald → replaced by  Emil Ruusuvuori

During the tournament
  Ilya Ivashka

Doubles main-draw entrants

Seeds

1 Rankings are as of 20 September 2021.

Other entrants
The following pairs received wildcards into the doubles main draw:
  Adrian Andreev /  Alexandar Lazarov
  Alexander Donski /  Dimitar Kuzmanov

The following pair received entry as alternates:
  Plamen Milushev /  Radoslav Shandarov

Withdrawals
Before the tournament
  Jérémy Chardy /  Hugo Nys → replaced by  André Göransson /  Hugo Nys 
  Matthew Ebden /  Jonathan Erlich → replaced by  Jonathan Erlich /  Dominic Inglot 
  Sander Gillé /  Joran Vliegen → replaced by  Jonny O'Mara /  Ken Skupski 
  Marcos Giron /  Mackenzie McDonald → replaced by  Lorenzo Musetti /  Andrea Vavassori
  Pedro Martínez /  Jaume Munar → replaced by  Plamen Milushev /  Radoslav Shandarov

References

External links 
Official website
Tournament page at ATPWorldTour.com

Sofia Open
Sofia Open
Sofia Open
Sofia Open
Sofia Open